Reginaldo Figueira de Faria (born 11 June 1937) is a Brazilian actor and film director. He has appeared in more than 60 films and television shows since 1952. Faria's brother Roberto Farias (the 's' was added to his surname due to an error at the registry) is also a film director and screenwriter.

Selected filmography

Film
 Cidade Ameaçada (1960)
 The ABC of Love (1967)
 Pra Quem Fica, Tchau (1971)
 Lucio Flavio (1977)
 Pra Frente, Brasil (1982)
 Memórias Póstumas (2001)
 Cazuza – O Tempo Não Pára (2004)
 O Carteiro (2011)

Television
 Vale Tudo (1988–1989)
 Tieta (1989–1990)
 Vamp (1991–1992)
 Olho no Olho (1993–1994)
 Explode Coração (1995–1996)
 Força de um Desejo (1999–2000)
 O Clone (2001–2002)
 Porto dos Milagres (2001)
 Cabocla (2004)
 América (2005)
 Paraíso Tropical (2007)
 Beleza Pura (2008)
 O Astro (2011)
 Cordel Encantado (2011)
 Amor Eterno Amor (2012)
 Louco por Elas (2012–2013)
 Joia Rara (2013–2014)
 Império (2014–2015)

References

External links

1937 births
Living people
Brazilian male film actors
Brazilian film directors
People from Nova Friburgo
20th-century Brazilian male actors
21st-century Brazilian male actors